Rafi Osmo (born 25 March 1963) is a former Israeli footballer. Between 2016 and 2020 he was the chairman of Maccabi Haifa, where he played most of his career.

Honours
Israeli Championships
1983–84, 1984–85, 1990–91

References

1963 births
Living people
Israeli footballers
Maccabi Haifa F.C. players
Hapoel Haifa F.C. players
Liga Leumit players
Footballers from Nesher
Israel international footballers
Association football defenders
Association football midfielders